The Rev. Kenneth Bryant Smith Sr. (February 19, 1931 – January 21, 2008) was a Chicago-area community leader and minister.

Smith was born in Montclair, New Jersey. After earning a bachelor's degree at Virginia Union University in 1953 and a master's degree from Drew University in 1954, he came to Chicago in the late 1950s to attend Bethany Theological Seminary, then located outside the city. He was ordained by the United Church of Christ and began his career as an associate pastor at the Congregational Church of Park Manor. From there, he founded the Trinity United Church of Christ, before pastoring long-term at Church of the Good Shepherd in Washington Park.

From 1979 to 1982, he was a member of the Chicago Board of Education. On May 16, 1980, only eight months after he joined the board, the members of the board elected him to a one-year term as the board's president. He was the first black person to hold the office since it was created in 1840. Smith ultimately declined to seek reelection by the board to its presidency in 1981.

From 1984 to 1999 he served as president of Chicago Theological Seminary.

In 1996, he received the Chicago History Museum "Making History Award" for Distinction in Public Service.

References

Sources
http://www.chicagotribune.com/news/local/chi-hed_ksmithjan23,1,197927.story?ctrack=1&cset=true
http://www.isfbank.com/kenneth_smith.html
https://web.archive.org/web/20120211113126/http://www.wideopenthinking.org/?p=111
Speller, Julia (2005). Walkin' the Talk: Keepin the Faith in Afrocentric Congregations, Pilgrim Press.
Susan B. Thistlethwaite (2008), "Remembering Ken Smith." Wide Open Thinking. Chicago Theological Seminary. https://web.archive.org/web/20120211113126/http://www.wideopenthinking.org/?p=111

United Church of Christ ministers
1931 births
2008 deaths
Bethany Theological Seminary alumni
Drew University alumni
People from Montclair, New Jersey
Virginia Union University alumni
Chicago Theological Seminary alumni
Presidents of the Chicago Board of Education